The canton of Altkirch is an administrative division of the Haut-Rhin department, northeastern France. Its borders were modified at the French canton reorganisation which came into effect in March 2015. Its seat is in Altkirch.

It consists of the following communes:

Altkirch
Aspach
Bendorf
Berentzwiller
Bettendorf
Bettlach
Biederthal
Bisel
Bouxwiller
Carspach
Courtavon
Durlinsdorf
Durmenach
Emlingen
Feldbach
Ferrette
Fislis
Franken
Frœningen
Hausgauen
Heidwiller
Heimersdorf
Heiwiller
Hirsingue
Hirtzbach
Hochstatt
Hundsbach
Illfurth
Illtal
Jettingen
Kiffis
Kœstlach
Levoncourt
Liebsdorf
Ligsdorf
Linsdorf
Lucelle
Luemschwiller
Lutter
Mœrnach
Muespach
Muespach-le-Haut
Oberlarg
Obermorschwiller
Oltingue
Raedersdorf
Riespach
Roppentzwiller
Ruederbach
Saint-Bernard
Schwoben
Sondersdorf
Spechbach
Steinsoultz
Tagolsheim
Tagsdorf
Vieux-Ferrette
Waldighofen
Walheim
Werentzhouse
Willer
Winkel
Wittersdorf
Wolschwiller

References

Cantons of Haut-Rhin